Natalie Portman is an Israeli-American actress and filmmaker who has received various awards and nominations, including an Academy Award, two Golden Globe Awards, and a British Academy Film Award. She has received additional nominations for two Academy Awards, two Golden Globes, and two British Academy Film Awards.

Portman's performance as a mysterious stripper in the romantic drama Closer (2004) earned her the Golden Globe Award for Best Supporting Actress – Motion Picture, and nominations for the Academy Award for Best Supporting Actress, the BAFTA Award for Best Actress in a Supporting Role, and the Satellite Award for Best Supporting Actress – Motion Picture. In 2005, Portman starred in dystopian political thriller V for Vendetta, based on the 1988 DC/Vertigo Comics limited series of the same name by Alan Moore and David Lloyd. For her performance as Evey Hammond, an employee of the state-run British Television Network, Portman was nominated for the Saturn Award for Best Actress, and the Scream Award for Scream Queen. In 2010, Portman starred as Nina Sayers, a mentally tortured dancer in a New York City ballet company, in Darren Aronofsky's psychological horror Black Swan. For her performance, she won the Academy Award for Best Actress, the BAFTA Award for Best Actress in a Leading Role, the Golden Globe Award for Best Actress in a Motion Picture – Drama, and the St. Louis Gateway Film Critics Association Award for Best Actress, and nominations for the Satellite Award for Best Supporting Actress – Motion Picture, and the Saturn Award for Best Actress.

Portman has received a Teen Choice Award nomination for playing the Marvel Cinematic Universe character, Jane Foster, a role she has played since 2011. In 2016, Portman starred in Pablo Larraín's biographical drama Jackie as Jacqueline Kennedy, when she was First Lady in the White House. Her performance went on to win the Chicago Film Critics Association Award for Best Actress, the Washington D.C. Area Film Critics Association Award for Best Actress, and the Critics' Choice Movie Award for Best Actress, and she was nominated for the Academy Award for Best Actress, the BAFTA Award for Best Actress in a Leading Role, the Empire Award for Best Actress, and the Satellite Award for Best Supporting Actress – Motion Picture. The next year, she was honored with the Ongoing Commitment Award given by the Environmental Media Association.

Awards and nominations

References

External links 
 

Portman, Natalie
Awards